"99.9% Sure (I've Never Been Here Before)" is a song written by Billy Austin and Greg Barnhill and recorded by American country music artist Brian McComas. It was released in February 2003 as the third single from McComas' self-titled debut album. The song reached No. 10 on the US Billboard Hot Country Singles & Tracks chart in August 2003. It was also McComas' only entry on the Billboard Hot 100, peaking at No. 57.

Critical reception
Brian Mansfield of USA Today stated that the song's "clean steel lines and bright guitars [blend] agreeably on contemporary country radio."

Music video

The music video was directed by Brent Hedgecock and premiered in early 2003.

Chart performance
"99.9% Sure (I've Never Been Here Before)" debuted at number 59 on the U.S. Billboard Hot Country Singles & Tracks chart for the week of March 8, 2003.

Year-end charts

References

2003 singles
Brian McComas songs
Lyric Street Records singles
Songs written by Greg Barnhill
2003 songs